Kalateh-ye Mohammad Soltan (also Romanized as Kalāteh-ye Moḩammad Solţān and Kalāteh Moḩammad Solţān; also known as Kalāt-e Moḩammad Solţān, Kalāte Moḩammad Solţan, and Moḩammad Solţān) is a village in Kahshang Rural District, in the Central District of Birjand County, South Khorasan Province, Iran. At the 2016 census, its population was 86, in 25 families.

References 

Populated places in Birjand County